The Millington Diamond engine family is a series of four-stroke  DOHC 16-valve straight-four cylinder racing engines, designed, developed and built by Millington Racing Engines since 1990.

References

Automobile engines
Internal combustion piston engines
Straight-four engines
Gasoline engines by model
Engines by model